Garnett Branch (also spelled Garnet Branch) is a stream in the U.S. state of Missouri.

Garnett Branch has the name of the local Garnet family.

See also
List of rivers of Missouri

References

Rivers of Knox County, Missouri
Rivers of Shelby County, Missouri
Rivers of Missouri